Isidro Candiá (born 15 May 1979) is a retired Paraguayan football midfielder. He was a squad member for the 1999 FIFA World Youth Championship.

References

1979 births
Living people
People from Luque
Paraguayan footballers
Paraguay youth international footballers
Sportivo Luqueño players
Club Libertad footballers
Club Universitario de Deportes footballers
12 de Octubre Football Club players
Deportivo Anzoátegui players
Unión Tarija players
Club Aurora players
Club Real Potosí players
Independiente Medellín footballers
Comunicaciones F.C. players
Bolivian Primera División players
Categoría Primera A players
Association football midfielders
Paraguayan expatriate footballers
Expatriate footballers in Peru
Paraguayan expatriate sportspeople in Peru
Expatriate footballers in Venezuela
Paraguayan expatriate sportspeople in Venezuela
Expatriate footballers in Bolivia
Paraguayan expatriate sportspeople in Bolivia
Expatriate footballers in Colombia
Paraguayan expatriate sportspeople in Colombia
Expatriate footballers in Guatemala